Kvitingskjølen is a mountain in Lom Municipality in Innlandet county, Norway. The mountain is surrounded by several other notable mountains including Eisteinhovde to the west; Veslekjølen to the northwest; Skarvhøi and Ilvetjørnhøi to the north; Grjothovden, Saukampen, and Liaberget to the east; Heranoshøi to the south; and Store Trollhøin and Finnshalspiggen.

See also
List of mountains of Norway

References

Lom, Norway
Mountains of Innlandet